The Battle of Ürümqi was a battle waged by Yaqub Beg's Turkic kingdom of Yettishar against Chinese Muslim rebels in Ürümqi in a bid to conquer all of Xinjiang and subjugate Chinese Muslims under his control.

Battle
Yaqub Beg's Turkic Andijani Uzbek Muslim forces declared a Jihad against Chinese Muslims (Dungans) under T'o Ming (Tuo Ming a.k.a. Daud Khalifa) during the Dungan Revolt. Yaqub Beg enlisted non Muslim Han Chinese militia under Xu Xuegong (Hsu Hsuehkung) in order to fight against the Chinese Muslims. Yaqub Beg had 1,500 Han Chinese militia with his Turkic forces attacking Dungans in Urumchi. The following year, in 1871, the Han Chinese militia switched sides and then joined the Dungans in a revolt against the Turkic forces. T'o Ming's forces were defeated by Yaqub, who planned to conquer Dzungharia. Yaqub intended to seize all Dungan territory.

Notes

Ürümqi 1870
1870 in China
History of Xinjiang
Urumchi